Dubovec is a village and municipality in the Rimavská Sobota District of the Banská Bystrica Region of southern Slovakia.

History
In historical records, the village was first mentioned in 1260 (1260 Dabacha, 1336 Doboulcha, 1460 Dobowcha), when it belonged to Blh castle. After it passed to Szèchy family. In 1683 it was pillaged by Turks. In 1700 it belonged to Koháry family and after to Muráň town.

Genealogical resources

The records for genealogical research are available at the state archive "Statny Archiv in Banska Bystrica, Slovakia"

 Roman Catholic church records (births/marriages/deaths): 1745-1883 (parish A)
 Reformated church records (births/marriages/deaths): 1795-1869 (parish B)

See also
 List of municipalities and towns in Slovakia

External links

http://www.gemer.org/_sub_obec/index.php?chid=28
http://www.e-obce.sk/obec/dubovec/dubovec.html
Surnames of living people in Dubovec

Villages and municipalities in Rimavská Sobota District